Alan Bernard (1934 –2011) was an American audio engineer.

Alan Bernard may also refer to:
Alan Bernard, a character in Village of the Damned (1960 film)
Alan Bernard, a character in Homeland (TV series)

See also 
 Alain Bernard, French swimmer